The play-offs of the 2021 Billie Jean King Cup Europe/Africa Zone Group III were the final stages of the Group III zonal competition involving teams from Europe and Africa. Using the positions determined in their pools, the twenty-one teams faced off to determine their placing in the 2021 Billie Jean King Cup Europe/Africa Zone Group III. The top two teams advanced to Billie Jean King Cup Europe/Africa Zone Group II.

1st to 6th play-offs 
The first placed teams of each pool were drawn in head-to-head rounds. The winners advanced to Group II in 2022.

Semifinals

Ireland vs. Bosnia and Herzegovina

South Africa vs. Malta

Promotional play-offs

Norway vs. Bosnia and Herzegovina

Malta vs. Lithuania

5th place play-off

Ireland vs. South Africa

7th to 12th play-offs 
The second placed teams of each pool were drawn in head-to-head rounds to find the equal 7th placed teams.

Semifinals

Armenia vs. Nigeria

Montenegro vs. North Macedonia

7th place play-offs

Cyprus vs. Nigeria

Montenegro vs. Algeria

11th place play-off

Armenia vs. North Macedonia

13th to 18th play-offs 
The third placed teams of each pool were drawn in head-to-head rounds to find the equal 13th placed teams.

Semifinals

Zimbabwe vs. Rwanda

Albania vs. Azerbaijan

13th place play-offs

Kosovo vs. Zimbabwe

Azerbaijan vs. Iceland

17th place play-off

Rwanda vs. Albania

19th to 21st play-offs 
The fourth placed teams of each pool were drawn in head-to-head rounds to find the 19th placed team.

Semifinal

Ghana vs. Namibia

19th place play-offs

Kenya vs. Namibia

Final placements 

References

External links 
 Billie Jean King Cup website

P3